Nova Maringá is a municipality in the state of Mato Grosso in the Central-West Region of Brazil. Nova Maringá is the municipality where the highest temperature ever measured in Brazil was recorded: 44.8 °C on the 4th and 5th of November 2020.

See also
List of municipalities in Mato Grosso

References

Municipalities in Mato Grosso